The FGCU Soccer Complex is the home field for the Florida Gulf Coast Eagles men's soccer team and the FGCU Eagles women's soccer team. The FGCU men's soccer team has played at the complex since the team's home debut against UNLV on September 9, 2007.

The record crowd for the stadium and for the women's soccer team is 2,014, which was set when the stadium for the first time hosted a 2014 NCAA tournament women's soccer match. The record crowd for the men's soccer team is 1,574 in a 2014 match against Akron.

References

Soccer venues in Florida
College soccer venues in the United States
Florida Gulf Coast Eagles men's soccer
Sports venues in Fort Myers, Florida
2007 establishments in Florida
Sports venues completed in 2007